The 1955–56 Sheffield Shield season was the 54th season of the Sheffield Shield, the domestic first-class cricket competition of Australia. New South Wales won the championship for the third consecutive year.

Table

Statistics

Most Runs
Jim Burke 701

Most Wickets
Pat Crawford 33

References

Sheffield Shield
Sheffield Shield
Sheffield Shield seasons